Fritz Schmidt may refer to:

Fritz Schmidt (Generalkommissar) (1903–1943), German Commissioner-General in the Netherlands
Fritz Schmidt (SS officer) (1906–1982), German SS officer at Treblinka extermination camp
Fritz Schmidt (field hockey) (born 1943), German retired field hockey player

See also
Schmidt (surname)